Paul McLoughlin (born 23 December 1963) is an English former footballer. He is currently manager of Clevedon Town.

References

External links

1963 births
Living people
English footballers
Association football forwards
English Football League players
Gisborne City AFC players
Cardiff City F.C. players
Shrewsbury Town F.C. players
Wolverhampton Wanderers F.C. players
Walsall F.C. players
York City F.C. players
Mansfield Town F.C. players
Bath City F.C. players
Weston-super-Mare A.F.C. players
Forest Green Rovers F.C. players
Clevedon Town F.C. players